Kathryn Jean Lopez (born March 22, 1976) is an American conservative columnist. She is the former editor and currently an editor-at-large of National Review Online. Her nickname on the website's group blog "The Corner" is "K-Lo", a wordplay based on "J-Lo," the popular nickname for Jennifer Lopez.

Early life
Lopez grew up in the Chelsea section of Manhattan, attended the all-girls Dominican Academy in New York, and graduated from The Catholic University of America in Washington, D.C., where she studied philosophy and politics. Before joining National Review in New York, she worked at the Heritage Foundation on Capitol Hill.

Career
Besides National Review and NRO, her work has appeared in The Wall Street Journal, The Washington Times, The Women's Quarterly, The National Catholic Register, Our Sunday Visitor, American Outlook, New York Press, and The Human Life Review, among other publications.

Lopez has appeared on CNN, C-SPAN, the Fox News Channel, MSNBC, and Oxygen and was a frequent guest on radio and TV shows, including Hugh Hewitt's nationally syndicated program and Vatican Radio.

References

External links

  Kathryn-Jean Lopez at National Review
 

1976 births
Living people
American columnists
The Heritage Foundation
Catholic University of America alumni
People from Chelsea, Manhattan
Journalists from New York City
Catholics from New York (state)
American women columnists
21st-century American women